The 2012 Texas Longhorns baseball team represented the Texas Longhorns baseball program for the University of Texas in the 2012 NCAA Division I baseball season.  Augie Garrido coached the team in his 16th season at Texas.

Personnel

Roster

Coaches

Schedule

Rankings

References

Texas Longhorns baseball seasons
Texas Longhorns Baseball
Texas Longhorns